At approximately 3:00 am (CDT) on Wednesday, June 23, 2021, 17-year-old Hunter Brittain, who was unarmed, was shot by Lonoke County sheriff's deputy Sgt. Michael Davis near Cabot, Arkansas, United States. He later died at North Little Rock Hospital.

Killing 
Brittain was attempting to use a jug of antifreeze to stop his truck from rolling into the officer's vehicle when the deputy shot him. Brittain's family claimed he was test driving a truck, which he had been working on when he was pulled over by the deputy.

Aftermath 
The body camera of the deputy was turned over to Arkansas State Police. The camera was not on during the shooting. Davis was fired for leaving his body cam off until after Brittain was shot.

The death of Brittain inspired protests. Attorneys Ben Crump and Devon Jacob are representing Brittain's family. At a memorial for Brittain, he was eulogized by Reverend Al Sharpton.

Brittain’s family and friends have proposed “Hunter’s Law”. The law would require all Arkansas police officers to wear a body camera which would be kept turned on during their shift.

Davis was found guilty at trial in March 2022 of negligent homicide, but not guilty of manslaughter and was sentenced to 1 year in jail plus a $1,000 fine. 1 year in jail is the maximum sentence for negligent homicide in Arkansas.

References

2021 controversies in the United States
Deaths by firearm in Arkansas
Deaths by person in Arkansas
June 2021 events in the United States
Law enforcement controversies in the United States
People shot dead by law enforcement officers in the United States